Saba Kumaritashvili (born 8 September 2000) is a Georgian luger who competes internationally.
 
He represented his country at the 2022 Winter Olympics.

Personal
He is the cousin of Nodar Kumaritashvili, who died during a training run for the 2010 Winter Olympics.

References

2000 births
Living people
Lugers at the 2022 Winter Olympics
Olympic lugers of Georgia (country)
Male lugers from Georgia (country)